The Franklin Falls Dam is located on the Pemigewasset River in the city of Franklin, New Hampshire, in the United States. During its construction, the neighboring residents of the town of Hill were forced to relocate to higher ground due to rising water levels created by the dam.

The Franklin Falls Reservoir hosts a variety of recreational activities, including hiking, mountain biking, fishing, kayaking, hunting, snowshoeing and Disc Golf.

See also
New Hampshire Historical Marker No. 162: New Hill Village

References

Dams in New Hampshire
Reservoirs in New Hampshire
United States Army Corps of Engineers dams
Dams completed in 1943
Buildings and structures in Merrimack County, New Hampshire
Landforms of Merrimack County, New Hampshire
Franklin, New Hampshire